"Choose Me (Rescue Me)" is the sixth single by the English R&B band, Loose Ends from their first studio album, A Little Spice, and was released in 1984 by Virgin Records. The song reached number 59 in the UK Charts.

Track listing
7” Single: VS697 
 "Choose Me (Rescue Me)"  3.35
 "Choose Me (Rescue Me)  (Dub Mix)"  4.35

12” Single: VS697-12
 "Choose Me (Rescue Me)  (Extended Remix)"  5.56 *
 "Choose Me (Rescue Me)  (Dub Mix)"  5.30

2nd 12” Single: VS697-12 - limited edition with bonus 12"
 "Choose Me (Rescue Me)  (Extended Remix)"  5.56
 "Choose Me (Rescue Me)  (Dub Mix)"  5.30
 "In The Sky  (Remix)" 
 "Mastermind Turntable Mix" - mixed by Nick Martinelli containing a medley of the tracks 'Tell Me What You Want' and 'Emergency (Dial 999)'.

 The Extended Remix of 'Choose Me (Rescue Me)' was released on the U.S. version of the CD album 'A Little Spice' (MCAD27141) instead of the Album Version.

Chart performance

References

External links
 "Choose Me" (1984) at Discogs.

1984 singles
Loose Ends (band) songs
Song recordings produced by Nick Martinelli
Songs written by Carl McIntosh (musician)
Songs written by Jane Eugene
Songs written by Steve Nichol
1984 songs
Virgin Records singles